The Polyspheric or Poly engines were V8 engines produced by Chrysler from 1955 to 1958 as lower-cost alternatives to the Hemi engines. These engines were based on the Hemi engines, using the same blocks and crankshaft parts, but completely different cylinder heads, pushrods, exhaust manifolds and pistons. 

They were called Polyspheric or Poly engines, because they featured polyspherical-shaped (meaning "more than one sphere") combustion chambers. These combustion chambers were formed by the two shallow concave domes where the intake and exhaust valve seats were.

Because these engines needed a less sophisticated rocker setup, with only a single rocker shaft in each head, they were also cheaper and lighter than their Hemi counterparts. In the Chrysler literature, the Poly engines were also called single rocker shaft (SRS), while the Hemi engines were called dual rocker shaft (DRS).

These engines replaced Chrysler's flathead inline-six in the division's lower-priced cars, and were themselves gradually replaced by the Chrysler A engine beginning in mid-1956.

Dodge and Plymouth 
Dodge and Plymouth both offered Poly versions of Dodge's Hemi engine. The Dodge versions were marketed as Red Ram or Super Red Ram (internal code A388).

241 
The 241 displaces  and was Plymouth's Poly version of the Dodge's 241 Hemi for 1955.

260 
The 260, also known as the 259, displaces  and was introduced in the middle of 1955 by Plymouth. It was a bored-out 241, having a  bore and keeping the  stroke. This engine was also used on 1955 and 1956 Dodge trucks.

270 
The 270 displaces  and was offered in both Plymouths (1956) and Dodges (1955–1956). Like its predecessors, it was a Poly version of Dodge's 270 Hemi. Outputs are  depending on fitment.

315 
The 315 displaces  and was a Poly version of Dodge's high-deck 315 Hemi. Only used on 1956 Dodges.

325 
The 325 displaces  and was a Poly version of Dodge's largest high-deck 325 Hemi. Used on 1957 and 1958 Dodge.

Chrysler 
The Spitfire engines were Poly variants of Chrysler's FirePower (Hemi) engine. Chrysler built three Spitfire engines: the 331 Poly, 354 Poly, and the all-new 301 Poly, which did not have a Hemi version. They were introduced for 1955 in the low-priced Chrysler Saratoga and Windsor models and were used through 1958.

All Chrysler Spitfire engines were low deck; no Poly version of the raised deck 392 Hemi engine was produced.

301 
The 301 displaces  and was Chrysler's smallest Poly engine. The 301 has a  bore and a  stroke.

331 
The 331 displaces  and was a Poly version of Chrysler's 331 Hemi.

354
The 354 displaces  and was a Poly version of Chrysler's 354 Hemi.

References 

Polyspheric
V8 engines